So Fresh: The Hits of Winter 2014 is a compilation that features 24 songs that have charted the top 40 on the ARIA Charts. The album was released on 13 June 2014. In 2014, the album was certified platinum in Australia.

Track listing

Charts

Year-end charts

Certifications

References

2014 compilation albums
So Fresh albums